Chiococca alba is a species of flowering plant in the coffee family (Rubiaceae) native  to Florida and the extreme southern tip of Texas in the United States, Bermuda, Mexico, Central America, the Caribbean, the Galápagos, and tropical South America. Common names include David's milkberry, West Indian milkberry, cahinca and West Indian snowberry. The specific epithet, alba, means "white" in Latin and refers to the color of its fruits.

Description
The fruit is a white drupe  in diameter that generally contains two dark brown seeds.

Taxonomy
Lonicera alba was described in 1753 by Carl Linnaeus.  It was moved to Chiococca in 1893 by A. S. Hitchcock, and is considered the type species of that genus. Stewardson Brown described the Bermuda population of the plant as a new species, C. bermudiana, in 1909 due to its lighter green and larger leaves, larger berries, and wider and longer pedicels. Many authorities consider C. bermudiana a synonym of C. alba.

Uses
Chiococca alba is sometimes cultivated as an ornamental for its dark green, evergreen foliage and white drupes. It is used in espalier and grown on trellises.  The roots have several uses in herbal medicine, including as a laxative, diuretic, emetic, and antidiarrhoeal. The plant was sold commercially in Europe and the United States for those purposes at one time.

References

Chiococceae
Plants described in 1893
Flora of Texas
Flora of Florida
Flora of Mexico
Flora of South America
Medicinal plants of Central America
Antidiarrhoeals
Medicinal plants of North America
Medicinal plants of South America